The Angolan Roller Hockey Championship is the top tier Roller Hockey Clubs Championship in Angola.

Summary

 In 2001 and 2010, a double round-robin final four playoff was organized.

Participation details

List of Winners

Number of Championships by team

Schedule and results

* Note: Numbers in brackets indicate round number

References

External links

Angola websites
Federação Angolana de Hóquei Patins

International
 Roller Hockey links worldwide
 Mundook-World Roller Hockey
Hardballhock-World Roller Hockey
Inforoller World Roller Hockey
 World Roller Hockey Blog
rink-hockey-news - World Roller Hockey
HoqueiPatins.cat - World Roller Hockey

Roller hockey competitions in Angola
A
Roller hockey in Angola
Sports leagues established in 1978